Weidenfeld may refer to:

People with the surname
 Dov Berish Weidenfeld (1881–1965), the Chief Rabbi of Tshebin (Trzebinia), Poland
 Edward Weidenfeld (fl. 1971–1991), American lawyer
 George Weidenfeld, Baron Weidenfeld (1919–2016), British publisher, philanthropist and newspaper columnist
 Nick Weidenfeld (born c. 1979), American television producer and executive
 Annabelle Whitestone, Lady Weidenfeld, (born c. 1946), English former concert manager

Other
 Weidenfeld & Nicolson, a British publisher

See also
 
 Wiedenfeld (disambiguation)
 Wiesenfeld (disambiguation)